Robert Guba Aisi (1957) is the former Permanent Representative (ambassador) of Papua New Guinea to the United Nations in New York. He presented his credentials to the Secretary General on June 25, 2002. Prior to being appointed to the United Nations, Aisi was Councillor of Papua New Guinea’s Legal Training Institute.

Aisi obtained a Bachelor of Laws degree from the University of Papua New Guinea in 1979. The following year, he was admitted to the practice of law in both the National and Supreme Courts of Papua New Guinea. From 1986 to 1990, he was Principal Legal Officer to the regional authorities in Port Moresby. From 1990 to 1992, he was Principal Legal Officer and Deputy Commission Secretary to Papua New Guinea’s Electricity Commission. He has also served with the Executive Branch (Legal Affairs) of UNESCO.

Aisi is also Honorary Consul of Papua New Guinea to South Africa, President of the Business Council of Papua New Guinea, and a member of the Australia-Papua New Guinea Business Council.

In February 2004, he was elected Chairman of the United Nations' Special Committee on decolonization.

Addressing the United Nations Security Council on the topic of climate change in April 2007, Aisi stated: “The dangers that the small island states and their populations face are no less serious than those nations threatened by guns and bombs.”

External links
 Ambassador Robert Guba Aisi presents Papua New Guinea's national report to the United Nations Human Rights Council for the Universal Periodic Review, 11 May 2011 (videos)

References

Year of birth missing (living people)
Living people
Papua New Guinean diplomats
People from the National Capital District (Papua New Guinea)
Permanent Representatives of Papua New Guinea to the United Nations
University of Papua New Guinea alumni